Croats in Sweden are citizens and residents of Sweden  of Croatian descent. As of 2017, they number approximately 28,000 individuals. Croats mostly follow Catholicism, but a small minority that have been living in Sweden for generations have converted to Evangelicalism. They mostly live in Stockholm, the capital city, and in Malmö, in Rosengård district. The most successful football club of Croats of Sweden is NK Croatia Malmö, that played in 1988 the Swedish 2nd League, declared in 1989 with title "Best Immigrant Club of Europe", winner of Malmö Mästerskap four times  (1988, 1989, 1991 and 2016).

Notable people
Zlatan Ibrahimović, Swedish footballer born in Sweden to a Bosniak father and a Croat mother 
Damir Markota, Croatian basketball player who grew up in Sweden 
Dennis Bozic, Swedish ice hockey player 
Slavenka Drakulić, Croatian novelist who lives in Sweden 
Ivana Gagula, Croatian born Swedish model
Branimir Hrgota, Swedish footballer 
Christer Lipovac, Swedish footballer 
Teddy Lučić, former Swedish footballer born to a Croatian father and a Finnish mother 
Peter Popovic, former Swedish ice hockey player 
Rade Prica, Swedish footballer 
Mattia Prskalo, Swedish model 
Robin Simović, Swedish footballer 
Teresa Utković, Swedish handball player 
Ivo Vazgeč, Swedish footballer

See also
 Croatia–Sweden relations
 Croats
 List of Croats

References

Serbia
Ethnic groups in Sweden